The Carpenters: A Christmas Portrait is a Christmas television special featuring The Carpenters that aired on ABC on December 19, 1978. It was the second Christmas TV special that the pop duo made and was taped in October 1978.

The special stars Richard and Karen Carpenter, with special guests Gene Kelly, Kristy and Jimmy McNichol, Georgia Engel, and Peter Pit.
The special is named after the Carpenters recently released Christmas album Christmas Portrait in October 1978.

Music
 "Christmas Waltz" (performed by Karen Carpenter)
 Opening Title Song ("We've Only Just Begun" instrumental)
 "Santa Claus Is Coming to Town" (performed by Karen Carpenter)
 "Jingle Bells" (performed by Karen Carpenter)
 "Brothers and Sisters" (performed by Carpenters with Kristy and Jimmy McNichol)
 "Merry Christmas Darling" (performed by Karen Carpenter)
 "Christmas in Killarney" (performed by Gene Kelly)
 "Selections from The Nutcracker" (instrumental, performed by Richard Carpenter)
 "Toyland" (performed by Richard Carpenter)
 "Christmas Angels" (performed by Karen Carpenter, Georgia Engel, and Kristy McNichol)
 "O Come All Ye Faithful" (performed by Gene Kelly, Karen Carpenter, Richard Carpenter)
 "Silent Night" (performed by Karen Carpenter and Georgia Engel)
 "Fum, Fum, Fum" (performed by Kristy and Jimmy McNichol)
 "Ave Maria" (performed by Karen Carpenter)
 Closing Music ("We've Only Just Begun" instrumental)

Synopsis
The synopsis of the special revolves around Karen and Richard throwing their annual Christmas party (just like the previous Christmas). They have invited all their special guests and the guests take turns giving their gifts to one another by song. Agnes and Harold Carpenter (Richard and Karen's parents) have cameos in this special. The last four songs just talk about the history of Christmas music and show a variety of selections from different cultures and languages.

External links
Video

Christmas Portrait
1978 television specials
1970s American television specials
Christmas television specials
American Broadcasting Company television specials
American Christmas television specials